is a Japanese voice actor.

Filmography

Anime series
 Air Master (Cameraman) (episode 2)
 Beet the Vandel Buster (Thread)
 Bobobo-bo Bo-bobo (Bobopatch (eps 16, 37), Hanpen, Kanransha, Radioman)
 Bleach (Yushima Oko)
 Comic Party (Coach)
 Tiger Mask (Red Death Mask)
 Digimon Fusion (BlueMeramon)
 Dokkoida?! (Matagu Shido) (episode 8)
 Dragon Ball Z Kai (Zarbon)
 Dragon Ball Super (Ganos)
 E's Otherwise (Chris, Rikuo)
 Fairy Musketeers (Dwarf) (episode 28)
 Gate Keepers (Male B)
 Ge Ge Ge no Kitarō (Masayuki (ep 14), Yasunari (ep 64))
 Gin-iro no Olynssis (Yousuke)
 Girls Bravo (Male 2) (episode 7)
 Hatara Kizzu Maihamu Gumi (Mansuke, Fukuda)
 Hataraki Man (Secretary Sakamoto) (episode 1)
 Katanagatari (Mitsubashi Maniwa) (episode 4)
 Kamisama Kazoku (Shinichi Kirishima)
 Kiddy Grade (Chevalier)
 Kin'iro no Corda
 Knight Hunters Eternity (Other voices) (episodes 1, 3, and 5)
 Knights of the Zodiac: Saint Seiya (Cygnus Hyōga)
 Kokoro Library Biker's Friend 2 (episodes 1, 12),  Editor C (episode 3)
 Lovege Chu ~Miracle Seiyū Hakusho~ (Aoki Yukia)
 Mermaid Melody: Pichi Pichi Pitch as Announcer (ep 31); Fan A (ep 78); Kengo; Man B (ep 81); Manager (ep 53)
 Nodame Cantabile: Paris (Roman) (episode 10)
 Oban Star-Racers (Prince Aikka)
 One Piece (Absalom, Pirates)
 Please Teacher! (Matagu Shido)
 Please Twins! (Matagu Shido)
 Shiba-wanko no Wa no Kokoro (Papa Youichi)
 Shrine of the Morning Mist (Handsome Boy A) (episode 16)
 Sister Princess: Re Pure (Elder brother)
 Stitch! (Takumi)
 Tokyo Majin (Detective A) (episode 8)
 Tokyo Majin Gakuen Kenpucho: The Second Act (Ryuji Mashiro)
 Weiß Kreuz (Various)
 World Trigger (2014) (Ryō Utagawa)
 Xenosaga: The Animation (Tony)
 Yu-Gi-Oh! (Male student) (episode 13)
 Kado: The Right Answer (Kojiro Shindo)

Original video animation
 Dai Yamato Zero-go (X-3)
 Please Teacher! (Matagu Shido)
 Please Twins! (Matagu Shido)
 Saint Seiya: The Hades Chapter - Elysion (Cygnus Hyoga)
 Saint Seiya: The Hades Chapter - Inferno (Cygnus Hyoga)

Anime films
 Kiddy Grade -Truth Dawn- (Chevalier)
 Mobile Suit Gundam: The Movie Trilogy (Boy E)

Tokusatsu
 Mahou Sentai Magiranger (Gestalt Hades Beastman Chimera) (Ep 33 - 34) (voice of Shizumi Niki and Kohei Fukuhara)

Video games
 Battle Fantasia (Ashley Loveless)
 Buso Renkin: Welcome to Papillon Park (Soya Muto - Kazuki and Tokiko's son)
 Dragon Shadow Spell (Ra, Werner)
 Dynasty Warriors 3 (Gan Ning)
 Dynasty Warriors 4 (Gan Ning)
 Dynasty Warriors 4: Empires (Edit Officer (Calm Voice))
 Dynasty Warriors 5 (Gan Ning)
 Dynasty Warriors 6 (Gan Ning)
 Dynasty Warriors 7 (Gan Ning, Guan Suo)
 Dynasty Warriors 8 (Gan Ning, Guan Suo)
 English Detective Mysteria (Akechi Kenichirou)
 Gate of Nightmares (Vyce)
 GioGio's Bizarre Adventure (Fugo)
 JoJo's Bizarre Adventure: Eyes of Heaven  (Joshu Higashikata)
 Mega Man Zero 3 (Blazin' Flizard)
 Rune Factory Frontier (Eric, Wagner)
 Saint Seiya: The Hades (Cygnus Hyoga)
 Saint Seiya Senki (Cygnus Hyoga)
 Shin Megami Tensei: Digital Devil Saga (Cielo)
 Shin Megami Tensei: Digital Devil Saga 2 (Cielo)
 Shining Tears (Piosu)
 Tales of Fandom Vol.1 (Arusa Littleton)
 The Legend of Heroes: Trails in the Sky (Richard Alan)
 Time Crisis 4 (Evan Bernard, Giorgio Bruno)
 Kamen Rider: Climax (Kamen Rider Kaixa)
 Time Crisis 5 (Wild Fang)
 Ultraman Fighting Evolution Rebirth (Pilot)
 Warriors Orochi (Gan Ning)
 Warriors Orochi 2 (Gan Ning)
 Warriors Orochi 3 (Gan Ning, Guan Suo)
 Yggdra Union: We'll Never Fight Alone (Gulcasa)
 Ikémen Sengoku: Romances Across Time (Uesugi Kenshin)
 Kamen Rider Summonride (Kamen Rider Kaixa)

Radio Drama
 Saint Seiya Ougon 12 Kyu Hen (Cygnus Hyoga)
 Side Story of Tokyo Savage (Tomoe)

Drama CD
Persona 3 Character Drama CD Vol. 4 (Hidetoshi Odagiri)
Endou-kun no Kansetsu Nikki (Tsuda)
Yoromeki Banchou (Ryo Yoshikawa)

Dubbing
Little Bear (Cat)
Stressed Eric (Brian Feeble)

References

External links
 Website at Aoni Production 
 

1977 births
Japanese male video game actors
Japanese male voice actors
Living people
Male voice actors from Nagano Prefecture
20th-century Japanese male actors
21st-century Japanese male actors
Aoni Production voice actors